Baree may refer to:

Bare'e language, an alternative name for the Pamona language
Bare'e people, an alternative name for the Pamona people
Baree, Queensland, a locality in Australia.
Baree, Son of Kazan, a 1917 American novel by James Oliver Curwood later adapted into Baree, Son of Kazan (1918) and Baree, Son of Kazan (1925)